The Prix du Public UBS is a prize assigned by the audience attending the Locarno Film Festival in Piazza Grande.

Winners 

 1994: Senza pelle, directed by Alessandro d'Alatri
 1995: Smoke, directed by Wayne Wang
 1996: Microcosmos, directed by Claude Nuridsany and Marie Pérennou
 2000: Hollow Man, directed by Paul Verhoeven
 2001: LagaanLagaan, directed by Ashutosh Gowariker
 2002: Bend it like Beckham, directed by Gurinder Chadha
 2003: Das Wunder von Bern, directed by Sönke Wortmann
 2004: Hacala Hasurit, directed by Eran Riklis
 2005: Zaïna, Cavalière de l'Atlas, directed by Bourlem Guerdijou
 2006: Das Leben der Anderen, directed by Florian Henckel von Donnersmarck
 2007: Death at a Funeral, directed by Frank Oz
 2008: Son of Rambow, directed by Garth Jennings
 2009: Giulias Verschwinden, directed by Christoph Schaub
 2010: The Human Resources Manager, directed by Eran Riklis
 2011: Monsieur Lazhar, directed by Philippe Falardeau
 2012: Lore, directed by Cate Shortland
 2013: Gabrielle, directed by Louise Archambault
 2014: Schweizer Helden, directed by Peter Luisi
 2014: The People vs. Fritz Bauer, directed by Lars Kraume
 2016: I, Daniel Blake, directed by Ken Loach
2017: The Big Sick, directed by Michael Showalter
2018: BlacKkKlansman, directed by Spike Lee
2019: Camille, by Boris Lojkine
2021: Hinterland, directed by Stefan Ruzowitzky

References

External links
 

Locarno Festival
Lists of award winners
Audience awards